Coneconam was an early 17th-century Wampanoag slave, and later, it is suspected, sachem of Manomet.

Capture
In 1611, Coneconam and Epenow were kidnapped by Captain Edward Harlow on  Martha's Vineyard. Capt. Harlow had already seized three Native Americans from Monhegan Island, Maine (Pechmo, Monopet, and Pekenimne, although Pechmo leaped overboard and escaped with a stolen boat cut from the stern), and at Nohono (Nantucket) he had kidnapped Sakaweston (who was to live for many years in England before fighting in the wars of Bohemia.) Altogether there were said to be twenty-nine Native Americans aboard Harlow's slaver when it arrived in England.

Later life
The names of both "Cawnacome" and "Apannow" appear on a 1621 document acknowledging themselves as subjects of King James. It is suspected that these are the same as Coneconam and Epenow. Coneconam (also spelled Cauneconam and Caunecum) was a sachem of Manomet, on Cape Cod. He died of exposure or starvation while in hiding from the English near Plimouth.

References

17th-century American slaves
Wampanoag people
Native American history of Massachusetts
Martha's Vineyard
People from Martha's Vineyard, Massachusetts
People from Dukes County, Massachusetts
Aquinnah, Massachusetts
Native American people from Massachusetts
People of colonial Massachusetts